Borlänge HK is a handball club in Borlänge in Sweden, established in 1947. The club won the Swedish women's national championship in 1970, 1973 and 1978. The women's team played 11 seasons in the Swedish top division between 1971-1972 and 1995-1996. and the men's team played in the Swedish top division during the 1984-1985 season.
After winning Division 2 during the previous season, the women's team have advanced to Div 1 North  as of season 2020-2021, while the men's team will play in division 2 East.

Sports Hall information

Name: – Maserhallen
City: – Borlänge
Capacity: – 1750
Address: – Masergatan 22, 784 40 Borlänge, Sweden

Kits

References

External links
 
 

1947 establishments in Sweden
Handball clubs established in 1947
Swedish handball clubs
Sport in Borlänge